Cordulegaster diastatops, the delta-spotted spiketail, is a species of spiketail in the family of dragonflies known as Cordulegastridae. It is found in North America.

The IUCN conservation status of Cordulegaster diastatops is "LC", least concern, with no immediate threat to the species' survival. The population is stable.

References

Further reading

External links

 

Cordulegastridae
Articles created by Qbugbot
Insects described in 1854